Michael Aish (born 24 July 1976) is a New Zealand long-distance runner. He competed at the 2004 Summer Olympics in Athens, in the men's 5000 metres. He is a prolific runner with a 2:13:21 personal best time in the marathon. He was formerly married to woman's U.S. Marathon Champion Nicole Aish and is presently married to long-distance runner Christy Burns.

References

External links

1976 births
Living people
New Zealand male long-distance runners
Olympic athletes of New Zealand
Athletes (track and field) at the 2000 Summer Olympics
Athletes (track and field) at the 2004 Summer Olympics
Commonwealth Games competitors for New Zealand
Athletes (track and field) at the 2006 Commonwealth Games
People educated at Francis Douglas Memorial College
20th-century New Zealand people
21st-century New Zealand people